Here are some of Kids' WB's most notable specials:

Grandma Got Run Over by a Reindeer

This Christmas special originally aired on Kids' WB on Monday, December 23, 2002 at 4:00 PM. It aired in The WB's primetime slots beforehand. Both entities have rebroadcast it, usually around Christmas time.

The Mastermind of Mirage Pokémon

This is the one-hour tenth-anniversary special of the Pokémon franchise, and it aired in the USA before anywhere else, even Japan. Kids' WB! first aired it on April 29, 2006 at 10:00 AM, and it was the first Pokémon program dubbed by Pokémon USA, and the only program dubbed by Pokémon USA to air on Kids' WB on The WB. Kids' WB ran a promotional sweepstakes during it to win Pokémon: Tenth Anniversary merchandise.

Pokémon: Destiny Deoxys

Kids' WB aired the English-language version of this movie on January 22, 2005 at 10:00 AM. However, it was edited due to time constraints. The full-length movie was released on DVD February 15, 2005. Before the movie, during the preceding programs, Kids' WB rolled out the red carpet to meet the stars of the movie.

Wakko's Wish

This two-hour direct-to-video Animaniacs movie originally aired on Kids' WB on February 22, 2000.

Welcome Home, Animaniacs!

This was the very first Kids' WB special, and was a Saturday morning preview special not unlike those that had been shown on ABC in the past. However, this special is rather hard to find, as not many WB Network affiliates actually aired it. And the few WB affiliates that did air the special aired it right after Kids' WB's first broadcast.

This special, hosted by Harland Williams, was built around the fact that, for Kids' WB's first season, Animaniacs was moving there from Fox Kids, and for the special, new animation of Yakko, Wakko and Dot had been produced driving away from the Fox studios to the Warner Bros. lot. In the meantime, the stars of The WB's prime-time shows gave viewers a look at the new shows:

 Robert Townsend and Curtis Williams of The Parent 'Hood gave a peek at the new season of Animaniacs
 Tia and Tamera Mowry from Sister, Sister introduced Freakazoid!
 Kirk Cameron showed off Earthworm Jim
 The Wayans Bros. gave a look at The Sylvester and Tweety Mysteries
 And Pinky and the Brain was featured as well.

Zolar
Kids' WB's first ever original movie, and one of their only live-action programs in history, debuted on May 29, 2004. It featured a sport-competing alien named Zolar, from another planet. His catch phrase was "Blue-yah!" During the movie, Kids' WB! ran a sweepstakes to win a year's supply of buttered popcorn. The movie featured guest appearances by pro skateboarder Jason Ellis (radio host) and freestyle motocross legend Mike Metzger.

Notable promotions
As recently as 2007, Kids' WB had many promotional giveaways, primarily to promote its programs and other Warner Bros. merchandise up for grabs.

Big Kids Go First

That was a slogan used to describe Kids' WB's schedule as of October 19, 1996 (when Waynehead premiered) through November 21 of that year. In an apparent attempt to simplify the four-hour Saturday morning schedule, the action-oriented superhero cartoons were moved to make up the first two hours of the schedule, with the comedy-oriented shows (including Waynehead) making up the last two hours. In this time, the schedule went as follows:

This move proved to be a disaster, the mistake being that "big kids" (supposedly the kids who would've preferred the superhero cartoons) were more likely to sleep in on Saturday mornings rather than wake up early to watch the shows. As a result of this, on November 22, Freakazoid and Earthworm Jim were taken off the Saturday morning block and moved to being shown on Friday afternoons until the following February, when they disappeared from the block entirely, only to have Freakazoid replaced with The Daffy Duck Show and Earthworm Jim replaced with a classic episode of Animaniacs.

An episode of Animaniacs that was broadcast sometime later parodied this move in its gag credit: "On The WB, Big Kids Go First / In Real Life, Big Kids Sleep In."

Devon and Cornwall's Dubba Dragon Day

Aired in May 1998, this broadcast was themed around promoting the release of the film Quest for Camelot. The backlot set used in the bumpers was specially designed with a medieval theme, and Devon and Cornwall, the two-headed dragon from the film, appeared in specially-made promotional spots.

Cleopatra's Dubba Diva Day
This 1998 broadcast was hosted by Cleopatra (group). The music video for their song "Life Ain't Easy" premiered at the end of the show.

Backstreet Boys' Terrifying Tower Takeover
This broadcast aired in 1998 was hosted by the Backstreet Boys. They introduced shows and talked about their monster characters in the music video for Everybody (Backstreet's Back) leading up to the world premiere.

BNL Day

BNL Day was the name given to the broadcast that aired on May 15, 1999, in which the Barenaked Ladies performed between each show. This event was originally intended to be titled Naked Day, but was changed due to complaints from parents.

Warnerama Celebrity Showcase Featuring NSYNC

This broadcast aired on May 1, 1999 was hosted by NSYNC. They as well as Kids WB characters performed between shows.

The Adventures of Static Shaq
These shorts promoted NBA legend Shaquille O'Neal's guest appearance in the Static Shock episode "Static Shaq".

Kids' WB Snow Jam

The Kids' WB Snow Jam was the name given to the broadcast that aired on February 5, 2000, in which Lou Bega performed between each show. New episodes of Kids' WB shows aired all morning, including three new episodes of Pokémon.

Kids' WB Big Premiere
This special promoted the series premieres of Yu-Gi-Oh!, The Mummy: The Animated Series, and The Nightmare Room and aired new episodes of X-Men: Evolution, Jackie Chan Adventures, and Pokemon: Johto League Champions. Originally set to air on September 15, 2001, it was later moved to September 29, due to most programming getting pre-empted by coverage of the September 11th terrorist attacks.

Halloween Duel of Screams
In 2002 and 2003, toward Halloween, Kids' WB would do a promotion similar to the Yu-Gi-Oh! Trading Card Game pitting Kids' WB characters against one another in a duel, but this time with screaming kids. Whoever had the most screaming kids that could affect others won the duel. It was always done in tournament style, but in 2002, Todd "Toad" Tolensky from X-Men: Evolution was disqualified for eating The Flea from ¡Mucha Lucha!, Ash Ketchum from Pokémon almost lost to Joey Wheeler from Yu-Gi-Oh!, and Jade Chan from Jackie Chan Adventures beat Yugi in the final round. In 2003, Yugi defeated The Masked Toilet from Mucha Lucha in the final round and won.

Hey Dragon, Down in Front!
This sweepstakes aired in the afternoon block for a week sometime in the spring of 2004, to promote Yu-Gi-Oh! The Movie: Pyramid of Light. Viewers had to identify a dragon from the Yu-Gi-Oh! series when Yugi said "Hey, (dragon's name), down in front!" and when they did, viewers were to log on to the website and enter for a chance to win Yu-Gi-Oh! card decks, as well as discount coupons for the movie.

Holiday Sock Party
The Holiday Sock Party was an ongoing event from 2001 to 2005, and had always taken place on the second Saturday in December. During this five-year period, the Kids' WB mascot, the Holiday Sock, usually goes inside of the Kids' WB! promotional watertower, with other characters from Kids' WB, in which they do Christmas-related things. In 2001 and 2002, the sock was the sole host; however, in 2003, The Flea from ¡Mucha Lucha! co-hosted. In 2004, the sock granted the wishes of viewers who wanted to "turn into something" on TV. In 2005, the set was then moved to the Fruit Salad Island from Coconut Fred's Fruit Salad Island with Coconut Fred as the co-host, and was about granting wishes again. This did not happen in 2006 and 2007, it was then replaced with a singalong for those two years, it didn't occur in 2008, as all of the Kids' WB networks except for the Australian version had disbanded. This promotion was not aired on the Australian Kids' WB network, because that version uses hosted content.

The Holiday Sock appeared as a question in the 20th Anniversary Edition of Trivial Pursuit, card #582, "Q: Who was not worn out by hosting the Holiday Sock Party? A: The Holiday Sock"

Kids' WB! Backlot Tour
Kids' WB had its Kids' WB! Backlot Tour in the parking lot of The Centre Ice Rink at the Delaware State Fairgrounds in Harrington, Delaware, July 20 to 29, 2006, during the Delaware State Fair. It featured the best of Kids' WB programming, Xbox 360 gaming, and other fun activities. It is a nationwide traveling show, usually at Six Flags Theme Park.

Mad Mad Mad Monkey Summer, Ooh Ooh Ahh Ahh (Just For Kids) Island, Gotta See-ee-eeh Falls
Beginning June 5, 2004, Kids' WB gave their lineup a monkey-based theme, entitling it "Mad Mad Mad Monkey Summer". They did promos such as "1001 Uses For a Banana" showing a Kids' WB character in need of a banana (usually where it doesn't help or makes things worse), "Stump the Monkey!" where viewers could go online and ask the monkey, "Professor Oo-oo-oo" questions, and pranks where someone in a gorilla costume would pop up randomly in a public area, scaring someone. Also, beginning June 14, 2004, Kids' WB gave their weekday lineup a monkey-related theme to go along with "Mad Mad Mad Monkey Summer" and entitled it "Ooh Ooh Ahh Ahh (Just for Kids) Island". As a special, until July 30, 2004, viewers could enter online to be the Monkey King of the day and have their picture on a monkey's body on TV. This promo lasted longer than Mad Mad Mad Monkey Summer (which ended August 21, 2004, Ooh Ooh Ahh Ahh ended October 22, 2004) and beginning September 17, 2004, Kids' WB entitled the Friday lineup "Gotta See-ee-eeh Falls", as they showed encore episodes of Mucha Lucha and Pokémon from the previous Saturday, and encore episodes of the new series Da Boom Crew and The Batman, as well as other things, such as new "lost" episodes of MegaMan: NT Warrior which were either skipped or dubbed out of order. However, this only went until October 15, 2004, a week earlier before it was originally scheduled to, when the network did a last-minute schedule change to prepare for November sweeps, replacing the scheduled encore of The Batman with an orderly rerun of Yu-Gi-Oh!.

Kids' WB! Way Outta The Way Road Trip

These promos consisted of Kids WB characters going on a “road trip” to real locations across the United States of America.

Magi-Nation: Battle for the Moonlands Sweepstakes
On May 17, 2008, Kids' WB held a sweepstakes to promote the online game "Magi-Nation: Battle for the Moonlands" on Cookie Jar's Magi-Nation website. In this sweepstakes, viewers were to watch Kids' WB! all morning long to find five secret code words, and then enter them online to be entered into a drawing for a pre-paid game card worth five dollars of in-game currency. This is the final sweepstakes Kids' WB! ever held, and it took place on their last day of programming.

Pillow Head Hour

The Pillow Head Hour began on June 4, 2005, as Kids' WB was showing the final episodes of Jackie Chan Adventures, it was a full hour at 8:00 EST (7:00 CST/PST), where they did promos featuring what Kids' WB characters' "Pillow Head Hair" would look like (what their hair would look like if they had just woken up from bed). The Pillow Head Hour was discontinued on June 25, 2005, when the network did a last-minute schedule change replacing Jackie Chan Adventures on July 2 with Teen Titans and The Batman. However, KidsWB.com made "Pillow Head Reports" featuring Gisselle, the Pillow Head Reporter for Kids' WB!, talking about things such as entertainment and media. Because of this, starting on January 7, 2006, when Saturdays were extended to five hours, the Pillow Head Hour was reborn at 7:00 am, featuring Giselle and a full hour of a randomly selected Kids' WB! show, and numerous guests talking about their "Pillow Head Hair". The Pillow Head Hour was discontinued once again on July 8, 2006, where Kids' WB! made their "Sizzlin' Summer Lineup" with two Yu-Gi-Oh! episodes in the former Pillow Head Hour's slot. This was supposed to be on September 23, 2006, for the 2006–2007 season, when it was then replaced with Shaggy and Scooby-Doo as then hosts of the block, from Shaggy & Scooby-Doo Get a Clue!, a show that was on Kids' WB, at that current period of time, until 2008, when Kids' WB had ceased, as well. Kids' WB was then replaced by then-4Kids block, The CW4Kids, following Kids' WB's disbandment in 2008; it had aired from 2008 to 2010. The CW4Kids was then replaced by Toonzai from 2010 to 2012. Following this, Saban Brands took over the block, renamed Vortexx until September 27, 2014. Until the end of the block, the first hour featured two programs which follow federally mandated E/I requirements and guidelines. Vortexx was eventually replaced by One Magnificent Morning which airs educational programming exclusively.

The Pokémon Premiere Party

This was the name given to Kids' WB's broadcast on February 13, 1999, which marked the first time that Pokémon was shown on the block (the episode aired on that date was "The Problem with Paras") as part of the comedy lineup. Unfortunately for fans of Warner Bros. Animation, though, it was in this same weekend that The Big Cartoonie Show (which came right after Pokémon) was shortened down to half an hour.

Top of the Tower Win-a-Rama
During the 2002–03 season, from time to time, Kids' WB would run a contest, usually during weekdays when they had them, where each day they gave you a code to enter on KidsWB.com and be drawn to win some merchandise, usually relating to a Kids' WB show. The first one was for Yu-Gi-Oh! in the week of September 16, 2002. Sometimes it coincided with the week as a show was given a special airing, such as the "Weekday Shift" that aired Rescue Heroes the whole week, the special weeks of catching up on The Mummy: The Animated Series or the week of new Cubix: Robots for Everyone episodes.

Zany Insany April
Ozzy from Ozzy & Drix hosted Kids' WB in April 2003, and named it "Zany Insany April". For the occasion, every week in April, at 3:30 pm, Kids' WB aired a show that would normally air on Saturday, such as Ozzy & Drix, The Mummy: The Animated Series, Static Shock, Mucha Lucha, and X-Men: Evolution. Saturday promos included the "You Rhyme It, We Rap It, Rap-a-Thon", where viewers could make a rap about a Kids' WB show and Scooby-Doo and Shaggy from Scooby-Doo would get some other Kids' WB character to perform the rap on TV, or the "Burpalicious Belchathon", where viewers could compete with Kids' WB characters to see how loud they could burp.

References

Kids' WB original shows